Sergiy Semyon (born 6 March 1990) is a Ukrainian footballer.

Career 
Semyon began his career in 2006 with FC Illichivets Mariupol in the Ukrainian Premier League, though he played in the Ukrainian Second League with FC Illichivets-2 Mariupol. After six years with Mariupol he signed with FC Motor Sich Zaporizhya. In 2015, he signed with FC Avanhard Kramatorsk in the Ukrainian First League. He returned to the Second League to have stints with NK Veres Rivne, and FC Myr Hornostayivka. He went abroad in 2017 to play in the Canadian Soccer League with FC Vorkuta. In his debut season he assisted in securing the regular season title.

References  

1990 births
Living people
Ukrainian footballers
FC Illichivets-2 Mariupol players
FC Kramatorsk players
NK Veres Rivne players
FC Myr Hornostayivka players
FC Continentals players
Canadian Soccer League (1998–present) players
Association football goalkeepers
Ukrainian Second League players